Francesco Sgalambro (16 April 1934 – 11 August 2016) was an Italian Roman Catholic bishop.

Ordained to the priesthood in 1957, Sgalambo served as an auxiliary bishop from 1986 to 2000 and then served as the bishop of the Roman Catholic Diocese of Cefalù from 2000 to 2009.

See also
 Roman Catholic Church in Italy

References

1934 births
2016 deaths
21st-century Italian Roman Catholic bishops